Sir Henry Yelverton, 2nd Baronet (6 July 1633 – 3 October 1670) was an English politician who sat in the House of Commons in 1660 and from 1664 to 1670.

Early life 
Yelverton was the son of Sir Christopher Yelverton, 1st Baronet and his wife Anne Twysden, daughter of Sir William Twysden, 1st Baronet. He inherited the baronetcy of Easton Maudit on the death of his father in 1654.

Career 
In 1660, Yelverton was elected Member of Parliament for Northamptonshire in the Convention Parliament. In 1664 he was elected MP for Northampton in the Cavalier Parliament and sat until his death in 1670 at the age of 37.

Personal life 
Yelverton married Susan Longueville, daughter of Charles Longueville, 12th Baron Grey de Ruthyn who became Baroness Grey de Ruthyn in her own right. Their son Charles inherited the barony and baronetcy.

References

1633 births
1670 deaths
English MPs 1660
English MPs 1661–1679
Baronets in the Baronetage of England
People from North Northamptonshire
Place of birth unknown